The 1890 Delaware football team represented Delaware College—now known as the University of Delaware—as an independent during the 1890 college football season.

The game against the Swarthmore Sophomores was the first organized intercollegiate football game in Delaware. "In Newark, when news leaked out in 1889 that the college boys were going to play football Sheriff Bill Simmons swore up and down Main Street that the first corpse carried off the field would mean the end of the game."

Schedule

References

Delaware
Delaware Fightin' Blue Hens football seasons
Delaware football